David Aikens House, also known as the Old Manse, is a historic home located at Columbus Township, Bartholomew County, Indiana. The house was built in 1877, and is a two-story, Italianate style cross-plan brick dwelling with a two-story, rear kitchen wing. It has a gable roof and sits on a limestone foundation. Also on the property is the contributing Nailed Frame Barn (c. 1905).

It was listed on the National Register of Historic Places in 2001.

References

Houses on the National Register of Historic Places in Indiana
Italianate architecture in Indiana
Houses completed in 1879
Buildings and structures in Bartholomew County, Indiana
National Register of Historic Places in Bartholomew County, Indiana
Houses in Indiana
Farms in Indiana
1879 establishments in Indiana